Dhowre Ali Sheneeleh was the castellan of the Darawiish fort / Dhulbahante garesa of Eyl (also called Illig), whilst the governor of Nugaaleed-Bari for the Darawiish was Ali Meggar. He was also the primary commander which spearheaded opposition to Abyssinian expansionism towards the east in the 1900s.

Exclusively Dhulbahante
The notion of the building of fortresses or Dhulbahante garesas for Dervish inhabitation was conceived first in the pre-1902 period with the Halin fort and subsequently when the Dervishes built a fort at Eyl also called Illig. According to the British War Office, the castle at Illig was exclusively inhabited by the Dhulbahante clan, and in particular by the Bah Ali Gheri subclan of the Dhulbahante:

According to Douglas Jardone, Eyl was the capital of Dervishes for four years, from 1905, until it was changed to Taleh in 1909, was at Eyl, also called Illig:

According to Douglas Jardine, the Dervish fortifications or Dhulbahante garesa at Illig or Eyl were exclusively inhabited by the Dhulbahante:

Governor of the Eyl fortress
Being appointed castellan of the Eyl fortress by extension made Dhowre Sheneeleh the governor of its expansive vicinity too, which roughly corresponds to modern-day Nugaaleed-Bari:

Daarta Dhowre Sheneeleh
The Secretary of the British War Office described Daarta Dhowre Sheneeleh as follows:

Capture of Eyl and other forts

The book Ferro e fuoco in Somalia by former Italian Somaliland governor Francesco Caroselli records the causes and circumstances of the Dervish abandonment of Eyl and other forts.  The letter, originally in Arabic, but since translated into Italian and Somali, records correspondence between the Sayid and the Italian Somali governor Giacomo De Martino stating that the forts were abandoned because the Dhulbahante tribe, of whom the Dervishes were members, had by and large surrendered.

Abyssinian expansion

According to a war report by British army colonel Alexander Rochfort, Dhowre Ali Sheneeleh was the most senior governor or commander at the southernmost Dervish base at Qollad, near present day Hiran, whereupon he clashed with an Abyssinian force allied to the British:

 One of their wounded who was captured states that these men who are Dervishes and wear as such distinguishing bands round the head and arm , were sent by mullah sheikh Ali Sheneeleh, a man of considerable influence between Hiran

Ali Meggar
Ali Xaaji Meggar, full name Cali Xaaji Axmed Aaden Meggar, as the Naval commander for the defence of Darawiish Coastal defence and fortifications at Eyl in a 1904 British intelligence report. The report claims that Ali Haji Meggar and Darawiish used a 7 pounder cannon to defend the Illig fort complex, and that he was injured and arrested in the process. Meggar was mentioned in the Geoffrey Archer's 1916 important members of Darawiish haroun list and the 1905 peace treaty granted him reprieve with a release from prison. An entire poem was dedicated to Meggar  by the Sayid, by the name CALI XAAJI AXMED. The poem details that Meggar died in the battle against Richard Corfield in 1913, and that he was the maternal cousin of the Sayid.

References

Somalian military leaders
19th-century Somalian people
Governors of Somalia